The 105th Brigade was a formation of  the British Army during the First World War. It was raised as part of the new army also known as Kitchener's Army and assigned to the 35th Division. The brigade served on the Western Front.

History
The infantry was originally composed of Bantams, that is soldiers who would otherwise be excluded from service due to their short stature. This became a regular infantry Brigade with the end of the Bantam experiment at the end of 1916, after it was noted that bantam replacements were not up to the physical standards of the original recruits.

The brigade was disbanded in April 1919 at Ripon, the brigade was not reformed in the Second World War.

Order of Battle
The composition of the brigade was as follows:
15th Battalion, (1st Birkenhead), Cheshire Regiment 
16th Battalion, (2nd Birkenhead), Cheshire Regiment (disbanded February 1918)
14th Battalion, (West of England), Gloucestershire Regiment (disbanded February 1918)
15th Battalion, (Nottingham), Sherwood Foresters
4th (Extra Reserve) Battalion, North Staffordshire Regiment (joined February 1918)
105th Machine Gun Company (joined April 1916, left for division MG battalion February 1918)
105th Trench Mortar Battery (joined February 1916)

Commanders
Brig-Gen J G Hunter C.B. to 16 April 1916
Lt-Col T Ranken 16 April 1916, to 1 May 1916
Lt-Col F W Daniell 1 to 6 May 1916
Brig-Gen A H Marindin 6 May 1916, to 27 March 1918
Lt-Col A W Crellin 27 to 31 March 1819
Lt-Col W Appleyard 31 March to 7 April 1918
Brig-Gen A Carton de Wiart V.C., D.S.O. 7 to 20 April (wounded) 
Lt-Col L M Stevens 20 to 22 April 1918
Brig-Gen A J Turner C.M.G. D.S.O. 22 April 1918 to March 1919

References

Bibliography

Infantry brigades of the British Army in World War I
Pals Brigades of the British Army